Bionix Radiation Therapy, LLC is an American medical device company known for manufacturing radiation oncology device.

History
Headquartered in Toledo, Ohio, USA, Bionix Radiation Therapy was founded in 1984 as Bionix Development Corporation by Doctor Andrew Milligan and Doctor James Huttner. In 2016, the companies split to become Bionix Radiation Therapy, LLC and Bionix Development Corporation.

Products and services
Bionix Radiation Therapy, LLC offers medical devices including patient immobilization devices for treating cancer using external beam. The company supplies such devices for cancer clinics, radiotherapy centers and medical oncology practices.

See also
 Radiation therapy

References

Companies established in 1984
Health care companies based in Ohio
Privately held companies based in Ohio